Bergshamra is a locality in Norrtälje Municipality, Stockholm County, Sweden. It had 749 inhabitants in 2010.

References 

Stockholm County
Stockholm urban area